Jonas W. Karlsson is a Finnish producer and songwriter. He was with the Finnish band Elokuu, and worked with Madeline Juno. He is a longtime collaborator of Sofi de la Torre, with whom he wrote the song "Vermillion" (2014), a release praised by critics.

Discography

With Elokuu

As producer
Another. Not Me. I'm Done (Sofi de la Torre, 2017)

References

Finnish record producers
Living people
Year of birth missing (living people)